Monte Verde Airport  is an airstrip serving the agricultural land around Monte Verde in the Santa Cruz Department of Bolivia.

See also

Transport in Bolivia
List of airports in Bolivia

References

External links 
Google Maps - Monte Verde Airport

Airports in Santa Cruz Department (Bolivia)